The 4th North Carolina Regiment was authorized on January 16, 1776 and established on April 15, 1776 at Wilmington, North Carolina for service with the Continental Army Southern Department under the command of Thomas Polk. The regiment saw action at the Battle of Brandywine, Battle of Germantown, Battle of Monmouth and the Siege of Charleston. The regiment was captured by the British Army at Charlestown, South Carolina, on May 12, 1780. The regiment was disbanded on January 1, 1783.

Officers
Commanders:
Col. Thomas Polk (1776-1778)
Col. James Armstrong (1778-1781)
Lt. Col. Henry "Hal" Dixon (1781-1782)
Lt. Col. Archibald Lytle (1782-1783)

Known Lt. Colonels
James Thackston
Henry "Hal" Dixon
Archibald Lytle
John Armstrong

Known Majors:
William Lee Davidson
John Armstrong
Thomas Harris
Charles McLean
Thomas Donoho
George Dougherty
Pinketham Eaton

Known regimental adjutants:
William Covington
Thomas Pasteur
William Slade
William Williams

Engagements
Known engagements during the American Revolution include:

References

Bibliography of the Continental Army in North Carolina compiled by the United States Army Center of Military History
 Lewis, J.D.; The Revolutionary War in North Carolina, 4th Regiment
  Davis, Charles L.; A Brief History of the North Carolina Troops on the Continental Establishment in the War of the Revolution with a Register of Officers of the Same, published in 1896, Link, accessed Jan 30, 2019
 

North Carolina regiments of the Continental Army
Military units and formations established in 1776
Military units and formations disestablished in 1783